Artur Nunes (17 December 1950 – 27 May 1977) was an Angolan musician, composer, and activist. In his time, Nunes was one of the most influential voices and composers in the pre-independence days of revolutionary Angola. Nunes, along with David Zé, Urbano de Castro, and many others, was a part of a group of musicians called the FAPLA-Povo Alliance who had the role to spread and divulge awareness to Angolan citizens helping a movement of revolution. He was nicknamed "O Espiritual" ("The Spiritual One").

His music career was short-lived, but he recorded a dozen singles, plus two songs on the 33rpm collection Rebita and Movimento. He was kidnapped and later assassinated by a group that dissolved from the MPLA during a failed attempt at a coup that took place on the 27 May 1977, and his music was banned from radio for more than a decade but nonetheless, Nunes is now regarded as one of Angola's most important musicians and public figures.

Early and personal life 
Son of María Luísa José Neto Fernandes and Artur Manuel Nunes, an Angolan mother and American father, Artur Nunes was born in Bairro Cuba, Sambizanga, Luanda. He frequented Escola de São Paulo e da Liga Nacional Africana in Bairro Cuba, otherwise known as Musseque Mota. He later on discovered his interest in music, political consciousness, and notion of the injustice his people were facing in Sambizanga, his neighborhood, where at the age of 14 his Cape-Verdean friend Sissi Mindo taught him the basics of how to play the guitar.

Later in his life, Nunes learned the trade of locksmithing and ended up getting a job as one. Nonetheless, he quit his job to pursue his career as a musician and activist.

Career 

Between 1972 and 1976, Nunes recorded 24 singles/LPs in the musical styles of Rebita, Movimento, Kuaba, and Merengue.

Some of his songs drew inspiration from kombas, the funeral rites his mother used to take him to where people would sing laments, and mixed Angolan folklore with Afro-soul and other genres. He performed with multiple groups who at the time were some of the best backing bands in Africa.

In the early 1970s, he met a couple of backing bands like Os Jovens do Prenda and Os Kiezos who accompanied him in his songs. He became a part of a trio which is nowadays known as "Trio da Saudade" with fellow singers David Zé and Urbano de Castro who later went on to become the most popular musicians of the early 1970s in Angola, a period which is described by music historians as the "golden era" of Angolan music. Their music was primary to the new cultural and nationalistic sense of identification that developed in their country at the time, turning them into main targets of the Portuguese authorities PIDE. They were known for politically charged music which was a mixture of Semba, Merengue, Rumba, and Bolero.

Nunes was involved in everything that was about cultural manifestation in Sambizanga, starting with the ephemeral "Mini-rhythm", being integrated in Kazukuta groups, namely the Turma do Bairro de Cuba, along with his uncle Zé Kimbomba diá Ngola. It all started in 1970 when he founded Luanda Show, which would have Ti Pirigo, Malex, Jeremias António, Candinho Adão and Mário Silva in its line-up. This, before going solo and collaborating with some of the best backing bands at that time like Os Meregues, Os Jovens do Prenda, Os Kiezos and África Ritmos, and along with Kissanguela, the political intervention musical group that came to dominate the post-independence musical scene.

After Angola gained its independence, Nunes, along with other musicians from the FAPLA-Povo Alliance, started to be celebrated and appreciated by Angolans, PALOPs, and even their president Agostinho Neto, who commissioned them to attend the independence celebrations of Mozambique, São Tomé and Príncipe and Guinea-Bissau, where they would perform their songs on tours with the president, as a sort of embassy of Angolan culture abroad.

Legacy 
After the end of the Angolan Civil War, a renewed interest in Nunes' music developed, and in 2001, an annual festival called Super Caldo do Poeira was established to celebrate his music and other early pioneers of Angolan music. In 2004, a double CD released by Rádio Nacional de Angola entitled Memorias was released, collecting and divulging a substantial part of the singer's work.

Discography

Singles and LPs

Compilations

References 

1977 deaths
20th-century Angolan male singers
People of the Angolan Civil War